Gabriel Abossolo (16 January 1939 – 9 November 2014) was a Cameroonian professional footballer who played as a defensive midfielder.

Career 
His career played out almost exclusively under the colours of Bordeaux where he played for 11 seasons.

References

External links 
  Profile on su pari-et-gagne.com
 

1939 births
2014 deaths
Footballers from Yaoundé
Association football defenders
Cameroonian footballers
Ligue 1 players
Stade Poitevin FC players
FC Girondins de Bordeaux players
Cameroon international footballers
1970 African Cup of Nations players
Cameroonian expatriate footballers
Expatriate footballers in France
Cameroonian expatriate sportspeople in France